The Boston Tea Party is a 1908 silent film directed by Edwin S. Porter, and produced and distributed by Edison Studios. The film is a fictionalized depiction of the events of the December 16, 1773, Boston Tea Party. It was the film debut of actor Charles Stanton Ogle.

Plot

Described by Edison Films as an "unrivalled historical production of colonial times", the synopsis of scenes was:

Production

The film was one of the first two films at Edison Studios made using a two production-unit system, by J. Searle Dawley and Frederick S. Armitage under the supervision of Edwin S. Porter.

Reception

The film received both positive and negative reviews. It was criticized for a lack of coherent narrative, and described as "marred by the obscurity of the opening scenes." Newspapers reportedly described it as "an exciting historical film" and "an exceptionally interesting reproduction of that historic event."

References

American historical drama films
1900s historical drama films
American silent short films
American black-and-white films
Films directed by Edwin S. Porter
Films directed by J. Searle Dawley
1900s American films
Silent American drama films